I Want My Wife Back is a British sitcom shown on BBC One, starring Ben Miller and Caroline Catz as Murray and Bex. It was broadcast on Monday nights in six parts and repeated during the week.

Series overview
Forty-six year old Murray is a nice guy; everyone says so. So no-one is more surprised than Murray when, on her 40th birthday and after 12 years of marriage, his wife Bex walks out on him. He feels bewildered and lost. Bex's mum and dad & his dad, in particular, are upset, and his attempts at helping them get back together fail. This begins Murray's quest to discover what went wrong and how to win her back, though it's less a journey than a floundering stumble in the dark towards the prize of returning his life to something approaching normality. All the while he's having to manage the demands of his ultra-needy team members at the office, as well as navigating his way through the well-meaning but counter-productive advice from friends and family.

Bex moves in with a single friend, who is obsessed with helping other formerly married women whose husbands have been unfaithful (though Murray hasn't). Bex's dad moves in with Murray - both feel quite depressed. Murray's boss (Curtis) is having an affair with another woman, and he gets Murray to tell stories that he was at work meetings. Meanwhile Emma (played by Susannah Fielding) a colleague at work, who as a crush on Murray is so pleased by the news and asks him out but, says other colleagues are going out with them when it's actually a date. She's only 27 and he's 46 so Bex thinks he's moving on and seems even less likely to get back with him. Murray wakes up in Emma's bed naked, unsure of what happened the night before. Bex moves in with her sister Keeley. Murray tries to re-propose to Bex, recalling they first met on a scuba diving course and visits Keeley's flat to find a positive pregnancy test which he assumes is Bex's (but is in fact Keeley's).  There is resulting confusion when Murray lets the news of the pregnancy (which he hasn't verified with Bex) slip to Don and Paula (Bex and Keeley's parents) who congratulate the wrong daughter. The final episode uses the scuba theme for Bex and Murray to come to a final reconciliation.

The series was compared with The Worst Week of My Life, which also starred Ben Miller as a man with bad luck where everything that can go wrong does, with plenty of embarrassing funny moments.

Reception
The Radio Times Alison Graham said "Though I might like to think that my comedy heart is made of coal and coated in tar, I am a sucker for silliness".  "I can’t help rather liking I Want My Wife Back. Miller is a deft light comedian, as is Catz, who plays the unfortunate Bex (though she needs to be given more to do). But it doesn’t have a mean bone in its body and it’s silly. It reminds me, too, of comedies from my childhood. Terry Scott would have worn the role of Murray like a leather driving glove, though he didn’t have Miller’s charm. There should always be room for good-hearted sitcoms. Peter Kay's Car Share, which has been shortlisted for a Bafta Radio Times Audience Award (vote here!), was lovely".

"I found myself ending the first episode with some faint interest in what happens next to the two protagonists. I know that’s not such a ringing endorsement, but like Murray and Bex’s marriage, the show shouldn’t be written off just yet. Smell my cheese."

"It’s a fairly straightforward premise – a couple splitting but not quite seamlessly splitting – and this being BBC1 it doesn’t exactly push the envelope creatively. But you can see a few quirkier subplots brewing that might spice things up – the boss who needs Murray to cover up for his philandering, the colleague who has a crush on Murray, the deadpan Welsh Asian friend with sexual issues who confides in Murray. Miller is never less than enjoyable as besuited, bewildered Murray. He is very good at Jack Lemmon-ish repressed comedy stress and juggling lots of comedic balls – verbal, physical – at the same time. He is also very good at showing how Murray is essentially a good person but a bit crap at organising his life. Some scenes are a bit blinking obvious though. When he walks in on an anger management group, for instance, guess what - someone gets angry. But as I said, this is BBC1. The most radical aspect is that this is not a studio-based Mrs Brown's Boys sitcom. Don't expect Catastrophe or Toast of London though, but IWMWB is certainly darker than Miranda. File under "potentially good" rather than "must-see".

Cast and characters

Ben Miller as Murray
Caroline Catz as Bex 
Peter Wright as Don (Bex's father)
Jan Francis as Paula (Bex's mother)
Cariad Lloyd as Keeley (Bex's sister)
 Kenneth Collard as Grant
Susannah Fielding as Emma (Murray's colleague, who has a crush on him)
Stewart Wright as Curtis
Kate Miles as Tamzin
Abigail Thaw as Abby
Priyanga Burford as Nareesha
James Lance as Julian Wolverton

Episodes

Series 1 (2016)

DVD release
All six episodes of I Want My Wife Back were released on DVD in Region 2, on 30 May 2016.

References

External links 
 

2016 British television series debuts
2016 British television series endings
2010s British sitcoms
BBC television sitcoms
English-language television shows
Midlife crisis in television